The Madison Marathon (Madison, Wisconsin) is an annual marathon foot-race run over a  course through the city of Madison.

Race day events also include a half marathon, a quarter marathon and a Kids Race.

2006

Nearly 5,000 people participated in the 2006 events.

The top male finisher was Joe Kurian, a 27-year-old Ph.D. student in toxicology at the University of Wisconsin, with a time of 2:41:47, while Kelley Hess, a 22-year-old University of Wisconsin graduate student in astronomy, won the female marathon in a time of 3:24:50.

2007
Race organizers announced that for the 2007 event, the race would officially revert to its original name, the Madison Marathon from Mad City Marathon. The top male finisher was Ricky Reusser, a University of Michigan Aerospace Engineering Graduate Student.

2008
With his second win in two years, defending champion Ricky Reusser won top honors again in the marathon.

2009
The start and finish were held at the Alliant Energy Center to eliminate the need for buses as part of being a Runner's World Green Marathon.  Ricky Reusser captured the top male marathon finisher award for the third consecutive year.

2010
Race organizers moved the Madison Marathon races start and finish lines to the Capitol Square.  Over 8,300 runners took part in the Marathon, Half Marathon Run, Half Marathon Walk (new this year) and Quarter Marathon races.  The male marathon winner was Ricky Reusser for the 4th year in a row.  These have been the only 4 marathons Reusser has ever run.  The 2006 male winner Joe Kurian came in second.

References

External links
 Official Website

Marathons in the United States
Sports in Madison, Wisconsin